The 2018–19 Richmond Spiders men's basketball team represented the University of Richmond during the 2018–19 NCAA Division I men's basketball season. They were led by 14th-year head coach Chris Mooney and played their home games at the Robins Center Richmond as members of the Atlantic 10 Conference.

The Spiders finished the season 13–20, 6–12 in A-10 play to finish in a tie with Saint Joseph's for tenth place. As the No. 11 seed in the A-10 tournament, they defeated Fordham in the first round before losing to Saint Louis in the second round.

Previous season
The Spiders finished the 2017–18 season 12–20, 9–9 in A-10 play to finish in a four-way tie for fifth place. As the No. 7 seed in the A-10 tournament, they defeated Duquesne in the second round before losing to St. Bonaventure in the quarterfinals.

Offseason

Departures

Incoming transfers

2018 recruiting class

Honors and awards

Preseason Awards 
Street & Smith's
 All-Conference - Grant Golden
 All-Defense - Jacob Gilyard

Lindy's Sports
All-Conference Second Team - Grant Golden
Top Defender - Jacob Gilyard

Roster

Schedule and results

|-
!colspan=9 style=| Exhibition

|-
!colspan=9 style=| Non-conference regular season

|-
!colspan=12 style=| A-10 regular season

|-
!colspan=9 style=| A-10 tournament

Source:

References

Richmond Spiders men's basketball seasons
Richmond
Richmond Spiders men's basketball
Richmond